Andersen Viana (born 1962) is an international composer.

Life
Born in Belo Horizonte, Minas Gerais, he has a Ph.D. in Music Composition from the Federal University of Bahia. He began composing at the age of thirteen and became a professor at the age of nineteen. He has studied with his father – Sebastiao Vianna – and in courses and seminars about music and film in several official institutions at Accademia Chigiana di Siena, Accademia Filarmonica di Bologna, Arts Academy of Rome, Royal College of Music in Stockholm, Federal University of Minas Gerais(UFMG), Federal University of Bahia(UFBA), among others. He currently works as a composer and a professor at the Clóvis Salgado Foundation (http://www.fcs.mg.gov.br) Brazil, in addition to offering lectures and workshops in various institutions both in Brazil and abroad. His first teacher was his father, Sebastião Vianna (assistant and reviser for the Brazilian composer, Heitor Villa-Lobos), and most recently furthered his studies in other institutions in Brazil, Italy, and Sweden. He has also published over forty articles both in Brazil and Europe.

Viana has received 37 composition awards in Argentina, Belgium, Brazil, Chile, France, Germany, Italy, Serbia, Spain, Ucraine and the USA, including the Genzmer Composition Prize - Munich University(2022), "Prix de Composition" at the "First Composition Competition Festin Choral 2013" in the city of Billère (France), first prize at the Susanville Symphony Composition Competition 2012 (USA), first prize in the international composition contest of "Lys Music Orchestra 2001" in Belgium, first prize and the audience prize in the "Lambersart 2006 International Contest of Composition" in France. To date, he has composed 430 musical pieces for voices, choir, chamber, symphonic orchestra, symphonic band as well as electronic instruments.

Viana has also composed film scores for the following films: A Cartomante, Retalhos do Taquaril, Bem Próximo do Mal (Next Evil), Jogando para o Amanhã, O Próximo Passo, Gun’s Speech, Trem Fantasma, 3:00:AM, Corações Ardentes, Filhos de Adão, Perdidos em Abbey Road, Vivalma, Manuelzão e Bananeira, Ofélia, Opostos, Minas Portuguesa, O Homem da Cabeça de Papelão, Convict, Ser Humano (Human Being), Um Dia Qualquer, Nego, Reenactment, Desafios, Oswaldo França Júnior, Padre Victor and Belatriz.

Ensembles
Viana has also organised and conducted/directed various vocal and instrumental ensembles, including: "Orquestra Experimental" (1983), "Septheto Rio" (1986), "Coro Pedagógico da FEBEM" (1991), "Coro do Centro de Estudos da Embaixada do Brasil em Roma" (1993), "Coro da Cultura Inglesa BH" (1994), "Trio Barroco" (1994), "Orchestra Virtual" (1995), "Estocolmo Nonet" (1996), “The Duo” (1997), “Coro da SMRU”, “Camerata Primavera” (2003), “A Cigarra e a Orquestra” (2006–2008),“Coral IOCHPE MAXION”(2009) and "Coral S.Vianna (2014). He has developed diverse musical projects in countries other than Brazil, such as Belgium, Bulgaria, Chile, the USA, France, Germany, Greece, Honduras, Italy, Portugal, the United Kingdom, the Czech Republic, Russia, Denmark, and Sweden.

Academic curriculum
Ph.D. in musical composition at the School of Music of Federal University of Bahia, Brazil
Specialization Course at the Reale Accademia Filarmonica di Bologna” in Composition of Film Music
Specialization Course at the “Arts Academy of Rome” in Composition 
Specialization Course at the “Accademia Chigiana di Siena” in composition of Film Music 
"Guest Student” at the Royal University College of Music in Stockholm - Sweden
BA in Music Composition by the School of Music at Federal University of Minas Gerais-Brazil
Methodology in Music Education UFMG 
Piano Interpretation Extension Course UFMG 
International Pro-Art Viola Course 
Curitiba Cultural Music Workshop
International Course of High-level Interpretation of the Violin and Viola                 
Poços de Caldas International Summer Music Course in Composition 
Workshops of screen writing, texts and cinema with Paulo Halm, Cláudio MacDowell and Ana Miranda.
 II International Seminar of Cinema and Audiovisual by the Federal University of Bahia
 Journey “ The Unconscious of the House, Identity and Migration by the Istituto Biaggi (Brazil-Italy)
 1° International Seminar of Cultural Management by Duo Information and Culture

Awards
2022 – First Prize at VII Harald Genzmer International Composition Competition for Violoncello and Piano, Munich

- IBLA FOUNDATION NEW YORK International Competition “Most Distinguished Musician”

– Best Sound Track at the Featured Film “All That Moves International Film Festival “ (São Paulo city)

2021 – First Prize at III International Composition Competition D. Shostakovich - Ucraine

– First Prize at IV International Composition Competition for String Quartet Piero Farulli - Italy

– Honor Medal and Diploma from Federal University of Minas Gerais  (UFMG)

– Second Prize at  VIII International Piano and Composition Competition Smederevo - Serbia.

2017 – First Prize at IV International Composition Competition for String Orchestra Marga marga (Consejo Nacional de la Cultura e de Las Artes), Chile

      – Best Sound Track at the National Theatre Festival (Barbacena-MG) 
2016 – Honorable Mention  from II Concurso de Composición para Orquesta de Cuerdas by IBERMÚSICAS Ibero-American State Organization (OEI)
2015 – Honorable Mention  (Auszeichnung)  from 14 Internationaler Kompositionswettbewerb um den Carl von Ossietzky-Preis at Universitat Oldenburg - Germany
2014 - Residence Prize from IBERMÚSICAS  (Ibero-American State Organization - OEI)
2013 - Composition Prize (PAMPA) at Residencia Nacional de Composición Musical  from Ministry of Culture-Argentina
      - Honorable Mention from the Jury at XV Concurso Internacional de Composición en Montserrat(Valencia) Spain.
      - “Prix de Composition” at “First Composition Competition Festin Choral 2013” city of Billère-France
2012 -  First Prize at  Susanville Symphony Composition Competition California-USA.
2009  - Honorable Mention at “BAM” Composition Competition, Netherlands.
2006 -  First Prize at "Concours de Composition pour Orchestre d’Harmonie" Lambersart – France. 
      - “Prix du Public” at "Concours de Composition pour Orchestre d’Harmonie" Lambersart - France.
- Second Prize at Composition Competition of Federal University of Bahia 
2004 -  First Prize at Gilberto Mendes Composition Prize
 - Honorable mention at “Coups de Vents” Composition Competition
2001 - "Best Sound Track" at the Gramado Film Festival at  especial category 
 	 -First Prize at the Funarte Composition Competition (String Quartet) 
 	 -Second Prize at the Funarte Composition Competition (String Orchestra) 
 	 -Second Prize at the Funarte Composition Competition (Symphonic Orchestra) 
         - Public Prize at the Funarte Composition Competition
         - First Prize at "1er Concours de Composition pour Orchestre à Vent" Lys Music Orchestra Comines - Belgium 
1998 - Second Prize at the II Camargo Guarnieri Composition Prize (USP Orchestra)
1998  - First Prize at the I Guerra-Peixe Composition Competition (FUNARJ-RJ)
1996 - First Prize at the II National Composition Competition for Double Bass (UFMG/ABC-Brazilian Double Bass Association)
1993 - Italo-Latin American Institute of Rome Prize (IILA-Accademia Chigiana di Siena)
1992 - Anzio Music Festival Prize
1989 - Scholarship Award, Berklee College of Music, Boston -USA
1986 - Funarte Sidney Miller Hall
1984 - First Prize in the National Composition Competition of Rio de Janeiro for Woodwinds (Coomusa)

References

External links 
 http://www.musictalkers.com/latest-news/international-music-award-composer-andersen-viana-in-1st-place-4478
 http://www.musicacademyonline.com/composer/biographies.php?bid=111
 http://www.voxnovus.com/composer/Andersen_Viana.htm
 http://www.pytheasmusic.org/viana.html
 http://www.classical-composers.org/comp/viana
 https://web.archive.org/web/20120817010739/http://www.cinemusic.com.br/

1962 births
Brazilian composers
Living people